Classic Puppets is a 2004 compilation CD by American rock band the Meat Puppets. It is composed of material from 1981 to 1989 (as well as a previously unreleased track from the Golden Lies period).

Reception 

In a three out-of five star review, Sean Westergaard of AllMusic remarked that Classic Puppets "does a decent job" anthologizing the band's output with SST Records, but that the compilation "seems almost like an afterthought" and "comes off as a bit lackluster."

Track listing
All songs written by Curt Kirkwood, unless otherwise noted.
  
 "Foreign Lawns" (Meat Puppets) - 0:38
 "H-Elenore" - 1:38
 "Blue Green God" (Meat Puppets) - 1:22
 "Walking Boss" (Doc Watson) – 2:40
 "Lost" - 3:28
 "Plateau" - 2:23
 "Lake of Fire" - 1:57
 "The Whistling Song" - 2:58
 "Up on the Sun" - 4:03
 "Swimming Ground" - 3:06
 "Enchanted Porkfist" - 2:31
 "Two Rivers" - 3:21
 "Out My Way" - 4:50
 "On the Move" - 3:50
 "Burn the Honky Tonk Down" (Wayne Kemp) - 1:59
 "Confusion Fog" - 3:51
 "Get On Down" - 2:56
 "Look At the Rain" - 4:20
 "Sexy Music" - 5:30
 "Dough Rey Mi" (Woody Guthrie) - 3:40
 "Light" - 4:19
 "Strings On Your Heart" - 3:40
 "Meltdown" - 3:35
 "New Leaf" - 4:20

References

Meat Puppets albums
2004 compilation albums
Rykodisc compilation albums